Guy Cronjé (born 26 July 1989) is a South African-born Zimbabwean international rugby union footballer, currently playing for KwaZulu-Natal club side College Rovers. His regular playing position is fly-half.

Club career

He was also a member of the University of Johannesburg squad during the 2012 and 2013 Varsity Cup competitions.

Representative rugby

Through his paternal grandparents, Cronjé gained eligibility to play for  internationally. In 2014, he was included in their squad for the 2014 Africa Cup competition.

References

External links
 
 itsrugby.co.uk profile

Living people
1989 births
South African rugby union players
Zimbabwe international rugby union players
Rugby union fly-halves
Rugby union players from Johannesburg
Golden Lions players
Sharks (Currie Cup) players
Afrikaner people
South African twins
Twin sportspeople
Alumni of Michaelhouse